Pushpagiri is a village in Kadapa District, in Andhra Pradesh, India. It has a number of important temples, of which the largest, Chennakesava Temple, is thought to date from 1298 AD.

References

External links 
 

Hindu pilgrimage sites in India